Antiope (minor planet designation: 90 Antiope) is a double asteroid in the outer asteroid belt. It was discovered on October 1, 1866, by Robert Luther. In 2000, it was found to consist of two almost-equally-sized bodies orbiting each other. At average diameters of about 88 km and 84 km, both components are among the 500 largest asteroids. Antiope is a member of the Themis family of asteroids that share similar orbital elements.

Naming 

The asteroid's proper name comes from Greek mythology, but it is disputed whether this is Antiope the Amazon or Antiope the mother of Amphion and Zethus.

Since the discovery of Antiope's binary nature, the name "Antiope" technically refers to the slightly larger of the two components, with the smaller component bearing the provisional designation S/2000 (90) 1. However, the name "Antiope" is also used to refer to the binary system as a whole.

Properties 

The most remarkable feature of Antiope is that it consists of two components of almost equal size (the difference in mass is less than 2.5%), making it a truly "double" asteroid. Its binary nature was discovered on 10 August 2000 by a group of astronomers using adaptive optics at the Keck Telescope on Mauna Kea. Before this, IRAS observations had suggested that the asteroid was 120 km in diameter.

Orbital 

Antiope orbits in the outer third of the core region of the asteroid belt, and is a member of the Themis family.

Since each component is about 86±1 km across, with their centers separated by only about 171 kilometers, the gap separating the two halves is about the same as the diameter of each component. As a result, the two bodies orbit around the common center of mass which lies in the space between them. The orbital period is approximately 16.50 hours, and the eccentricity below 0.006. Every several years, a period of mutual occultations occurs when the asteroid is viewed from Earth. Using Kepler's third law, the mass and density of the components can be derived from the orbital period and component sizes.

The axis of the mutual orbit of the two components points towards ecliptic coordinates (β, λ) = (200°, 38°) with 2 degrees uncertainty. This is tilted about 63° to the circumsolar orbit of the system.

Physical 

Antiope itself has an average diameter of about 88 km, while its twin, S/2000 (90) 1, has an average diameter of 84 km. Like most bodies in this region, the components of the Antiope system are of the dark C spectral type, indicating a carbonaceous composition. The low density of its components (see below) suggests a significant porosity (>30%), indicating rubble-pile asteroids composed of debris that accumulated in the aftermath of a previous asteroid collision, possibly the one that formed the Themis family.

Complementary observations using adaptive optic observations on 8–10 m class telescopes and mutual events photometric lightcurve over several months have served as input quantities for a derivation of a whole set of other physical parameters (shapes of the components, surface scattering, bulk density, and internal properties). The shape model is consistent with slightly non-spherical components, having a size ratio of 0.95 (with an average radius of 42.9 km), and exhibiting equilibrium figures for homogeneous rotating bodies. A comparison with grazing occultation event lightcurves taken in 2003 suggests that the real shape of the components do not depart much from Roche equilibrium figures (by more than 10%).

Observations from the VLT-UT4 telescope equipped with an adaptive optics system in 2007 and lightcurve data analysis suggest that one of the components appears to have a 68 km bowl-shaped impact crater that may be the result of a violent collision of proto-Antiope into two equisized bodies. The impactor is calculated to have been more than 17 km in diameter. The crater can not be resolved using the W.M. Keck II telescope.

The two parts of the Antiope have very similar spectra. This implies they may have a common origin, such as being formed from the breakup of a larger rubble-pile asteroid, but other formation scenarios cannot be ruled out.

Occultations 

There have been 9 occultations observed since 1988, many of which are multichord occultations.

The best is the July 19, 2011 event observed from 57 stations spread out along the western USA coast where 46 stations recorded positive occultations and 11 stations observed misses. However many of the misses were important to clearly separate the two components of 90 Antiope. Alas, many planned stations were clouded. Many stations were so-called Mighty-Mini or Mighty-Maxi consisting of a binocular objective (homemade using binoculars + hacksaw + plumbing fittings) as well as a video camera and Video Time Inserter (VTI), and were pre-pointed and left to run unattended, thereby allowing one observer to deploy many stations.

The crater mentioned above was confirmed by this occultation.

References

External links 
 Discovery of Companions to Asteroids 762 Pulcova and 90 Antiope SWrI Press Release.
 (90) Antiope, datasheet, johnstonsarchive.net
 Asteroids with Satellites, Robert Johnston, johnstonsarchive.net
 online data on the Antiope system maintained by F. Marchis; includes images and simulated occultation movies.
 ESO Press-Release published on May 29, 2007 The Impossible Siblings
 UC-Berkeley Press-Release published on May 29, 2007 Binary asteroid revealed as twin rubble piles
Antiope, a true binary asteroid, The Planetary Society weblog, E. Lakdawalla, 11 April 2007.
 An Occultation by the double asteroid (90) Antiope seen in California (Franck Marchis)
 
 
 

Themis asteroids
Beagle asteroids
Antiope
Antiope
Binary asteroids
Articles containing video clips
C-type asteroids (Tholen)
C-type asteroids (SMASS)
Objects observed by stellar occultation
18661001